Jung Chan-woo (born February 28, 1968), is a South Korean comedian, actor and singer. He is member of comedy duo Cultwo. His syndicated talk radio show Cultwo Show, airs via the SBS Power FM since 2006.

Filmography

Television

References

External links
 
 

1968 births
Living people
South Korean male singers
South Korean pop singers
South Korean male comedians
South Korean radio presenters
South Korean male stage actors
South Korean male musical theatre actors
South Korean male television actors
Musical theatre directors